Elachista gormella is a moth of the family Elachistidae. It is found on the Iberian Peninsula and in France, Italy, the Czech Republic, Slovakia, Hungary and Ukraine.

References

gormella
Moths described in 1987
Moths of Europe